Hookswood is a locality in the Western Downs Region, Queensland, Australia.

History 
The locality takes its name from an early-1850s pastoral run on Dogwood Creek operated by John Ferrettin (together with the Dogwood run to the immediate south). In 1852 C.J. McKenzie took over both runs.

Hookswood State School opened in 1914 and due to low student numbers closed in 1922 . The school reopened in 1923 but closed again. It reopened in 1925 and closed again in 1926.

Road infrastructure
The Warrego Highway passes to the south, and the Leichhardt Highway to the west.

References 

Western Downs Region
Localities in Queensland